The Revolutionary Communist Party is a Marxist–Leninist–Maoist political party in Argentina.

The party is part of the Frente de Todos coalition that supported the presidential candidate Alberto Fernández during the 2019 Argentine general election.

History

Beginnings as PC(CNRR)
The party emerged from a split in the Communist Party of Argentina in 1967. On January 6, 1968 (the 50th anniversary of the founding of the Communist Party) the dissidents formed the Communist Party – National Revolutionary Recovery Committee (abbreviated PC(CNRR)). The founders of PC(CNRR) came mainly from the Communist Youth Federation (FJC), although the group also included some Communist Party cadres. Leaders of PC(CNRR) included Jorge Rocha, Carlos Echagüe, Lucila Irene Edelman, Ricardo Helman, José Ratzer, Antonio Sofía and Otto C. Vargas (veteran leader of FJC and erstwhile secretary of La Plata Zone Committee of the Communist Party). PC(CNRR) published Nueva Hora. PC(CNRR) rejected the Communist Party line of building a broad democratic front, accusing the Communist Party of 'conciliation with imperialism' and 'class conciliation'. In contrast to the democratic front line of the old party, PC(CNRR) called for the building of a national liberation front. PC(CNRR) sought to work within the Communist Party, to gain followers amongst its ranks.

PC(CNRR) was active inside the Argentine University Federation (FUA). In late 1967 the Communist Party dissidents (that soon would form PC(CNRR)) set up the Textile Organizational and Struggle Command (COLT) as its front group amongst textile workers.

On January 10, 1969 the name PCR was adopted, marking a definite break with the old Communist Party.

Development towards Maoism
Initially PC(CNRR)/PCR had a 'guevarist' orientation. The party turned towards Maoism following a visit to China by a PCR delegation in 1972. The development of a Maoist identity of party led to a split, in which the adherents of immediate armed struggle were expelled from the party.

Involvement in automobile industry unions
PCR sought to organize workers in the automobile industry, by distribution of pamphlets at factory gates and sending some of its cadres to take up employment at factories. In the wake of the 1969 Cordobazo, the PCR identified the Perdiel plant as a priority for union organizing. Soon the PCR-dominated left opposition began gaining influence at the plant. On May 12, 1970 PCR activists took a group of French supervisors hostage at the Perdriel plant of IKA-Renault. This action was done in protest against the removal of leftist candidates in the local union election. The factory management caved in and reinstated the leftist candidates. The May 12, 1970 factory occupation marked the start of more militant industrial struggles in Argentina.

In late 1971, ahead of the 1972 Union of Automotor Transport Mechanics and Similar Trades (Smata) union election in Córdoba, PCR and other left groups (Communist Party, Communist Vanguard, Palabra Obrera, El Obrero, Peronismo de Base and non-affiliated leftists) launched the Trade Union Recovery Movement (MRS). On April 30, 1972 PCR won various leadership posts in the Union of Automotor Transport Mechanics and Similar Trades (Smata) union election in Córdoba. The MRS brown list defeated the Peronist green list. René Salamca, a Central Committee member of the party, was elected general secretary of SMATA-Córdoba, accompanied by Roque Romero as assistant secretary.

FRA and the 1975 crisis
Ahead of the March 1973 general election, the PCR formed the Fuerza Revolucionaria Antiacuerdista (FRA, "Revolutionary Anti-Accord Force") together with Communist Vanguard and independent left groups.

In 1975, the PCR called for support to Isabel Perón's government.

After the return of democracy (since 1983)
PCR set up the Party of Labour and of the People (PTP) as a separate entity to build a broader, legal base. PTP contested the 1987 legislative election.

In the 1989 general election PTP supported the candidature of Carlos Menem for president and his Frejupo alliance. Clelia Íscaro of PTP (i.e. PCR) stood as a parliamentary candidate for Frejupo.

PTP contested the 1993 legislative election.

Following the struggles after the events in Santiago del Estero in 1993, the PCR developed a line of electoral abstention (calling for blank vote) and call for insurrection.

The PCR today

Involvement in the Piquetero movement
Within the onset of the 1998–2002 Argentine great depression, the party assigned Juan Carlos Alderete to build a section for unemployed within the Corriente Clasista y Combativa (CCC, the PCR trade union front organization). Thus the CCC became the key element of the activity of PCR in the piquetero movement CCC formed a tactical alliance with the CTA-linked piquetero group FTV, and the FTV-CCC alliance emerged as the dominant bloc in the piquetero movement 2000–2003. The FTV-CCC bloc carried out several mass protests in the Buenos Aires urban area against the social and economic policies of the government. In 2003 the alliance between FTV and CCC broke apart over differences on how to relate to the Nestor Kirchner administration, as FTV favoured cooperation with the new government whilst CCC rejected it.

Rural movements
PCR maintains networks within agrarian movements such as Movimiento Mujeres en Lucha (MML), Juventud Agraria and Federación Agraria Argentina (FAA).

Outreach
PCR publishes Hoy as its main organ., and counts with a youth wing of the party called Revolutionary Communist Youth (Juventud Comunista Revolucionaria, JCR). JCR publishes the monthly La Chispa.

References

External links
 Revolutionary Communist Party of Argentina

Anti-revisionist organizations
Communist parties in Argentina
Far-left politics in Argentina
Maoist parties in Argentina
Political parties established in 1968
1968 establishments in Argentina
Maoism in South America